Damar may refer to:

Places
 Damar Island, Maluku Province, Indonesia
 Mount Wurlali, also known as Mount Damar, a stratovolcano on the island
 Amaro, Friuli (Friulian: Damâr), a commune in Italy
 Damar, Quezon City, Philippines, a barangay
 Damar, Murgul, Turkey, a mining village in Artvin Province
 Damar mine
 Damar, Lice, a neighbourhood in the Lice District of Diyarbakır Province, Turkey
 Damar, Kansas, United States, a city
 Dhamar, Yemen (romanized: Ḏamār), a city

People
 Amar Singh Damar (born 1925), Indian politician
 Germaine Damar (born 1929), Luxembourger actress and dancer
 Muhammed Damar (born 2004), German footballer
 Damar Forbes (born 1990), Jamaican long jumper
 Damar Hamlin (born 1998), American football player

Arts and entertainment
 Damar (Star Trek), a fictional character in Star Trek: Deep Space Nine
 Damar, a fictional land in fantasy novels by Robin McKinley
 "Damar", a 2020 single by Mustafa Sandal - see Mustafa Sandal discography

See also 

 Dhamar (disambiguation)
 Damar gum, a resin produced by the tree family Dipterocarpaceae
 DeMar

Masculine given names